Travis Holland is an American writer. His work has appeared in Ploughshares, Glimmer Train and Five Points, and his debut novel The Archivist's Story was nominated for the International Dublin Literary Award. He holds an MFA from the University of Michigan where he twice received the Hopwood Award.

Bibliography
The Archivist's Story (2007),

References

External links

Interview with Travis Holland.

Living people
University of Michigan alumni
American short story writers
American male short story writers
Year of birth missing (living people)
Hopwood Award winners